This page lists the major power stations located in Hebei Province.

Non-renewable

Coal-based

Natural gas based

Nuclear
Four nuclear power stations have been proposed in Hebei province:
1) China National Nuclear Corporation(CNNC) plans to build Qinhuangdao Nuclear Power Station.
2) China Guangdong Nuclear Power Group(CGNPC) plans to build Chengde Nuclear Power Station.
3) China Huadian Corporation plans to build Cangzhou Nuclear Power Station.
4) China Huaneng Group plans to build nuclear power station around Luan River downstream area close to Tangshan.

Renewable

Hydroelectric

Conventional

Pumped-storage

Wind
Hebei has very rich resource of wind power. By the end of 2010, the total installed capacity will reach 3300MW. Most of wind farms are located close to Inner Mongolia and the shores of Bohai Sea.

References 

Power stations
Hebei